Favier may refer to:

Jean-Louis Favier (1711–1784)
Pierre-Marie-Alphonse Favier (1837–1905), French missionary to China
Jean-Jacques Favier (born 1949), French engineer and astronaut
Amanda Favier (born 1979)
Denis Favier (born 1959)
Efigenio Favier (born 1959)
Jean Favier (1932–2014)
John Favier (born 1960)
Julien Favier (born 1980)
Lucie Favier (1932–2003)
Matt Favier (born 1965)
 (born 1963), French actress